The Honorable Society of King's Inns  is the "Inn of Court" for the Bar of Ireland. Established in 1541, King's Inns is Ireland's oldest school of law and one of Ireland's significant historical environments.

The Benchers of King's Inns award the degree of barrister-at-law necessary to qualify as a barrister be called to the bar in Ireland. As well as training future and qualified barristers, the school extends its reach to a diverse community of people from legal and non-legal backgrounds offering a range of accessible part-time courses in specialist areas of the law. King's Inns is also a centre of excellence in promoting the use of the Irish language in the law.

History

The society was granted a royal charter by King Henry VIII in 1541, 51 years before Trinity College Dublin was founded, making it one of the oldest professional and educational institutions in the English-speaking world. The founders named their society in honour of King Henry VIII of England and his newly established Kingdom of Ireland. It secured a lease of lands, originally called 
"Blackfriars", at Inns Quay on the north bank of the River Liffey in Dublin. It was reconstituted in 1607, having been inactive for some time. In 1790 the Inns Quays site was acquired for the purposes of the Four Courts; the foundation stone at the present building at the top of Henrietta Street was laid on 1 August 1800, with James Gandon being commissioned as the architect. The building was completed by his pupil Henry Aaron Baker. Turn Again Lane, adjacent to the grounds, was renamed King's Inns Street.

From almost the moment that King's Inns was founded, Irishmen who wished to practise as barristers were required to attend the English Inns of Court in London, and that requirement stayed in place until the late nineteenth century. Only from the middle of the eighteenth century onwards were courses of legal education provided at King's Inns.

King's Inns initially hoped the 1920–1922 partition of Ireland would not end its all-island remit, and it set up a "Committee of Fifteen" Northern Ireland benchers in 1922. These sought more independence and separatism was fuelled by King's Inns' admitting in 1925 as a barrister of Kevin O'Higgins, who had not sat the exams but was Minister for Justice in the Irish Free State. In 1926 a separate inn of court in Northern Ireland catered for the Bar of Northern Ireland. In 1929 Hugh Kennedy succeeded in making knowledge of Irish compulsory for admission to King's Inns.

Academic life

With courses taught by expert law practitioners, King's Inns students include leaders, advocates, innovators and game-changers from industries across Ireland and abroad. The School is also a centre of excellence in promoting the use of the Irish language in the law. All courses are suitable for those in full–time employment, with classes taking place early morning, evening, or the weekend. Many lectures are delivered live online as well as recorded for viewing at a later stage through our Virtual Learning Environment, where lecture notes and supplemental reading are provided ahead of class time.

Each course is delivered by an array of visiting speakers from the legal, business and communication industries, including senior members of the judiciary. They are all willing to share their vast knowledge and experience with students at King's Inns.

Profile

The society had generally kept a low profile in current affairs in Ireland, though it did come to prominence in 1972, when financial difficulties led to it selling a considerable stock of non-legal books it had in its library. The library collection dates from the end of the 18th century (when it also adopted its motto 'Nolumus mutari'), and was based in part on that of Christopher Robinson, senior puisne judge of the Court of King's Bench (Ireland), who died in 1787. Books were sold at auction at Sotheby's, London, and a considerable stock of them was sold to clients outside Ireland. This was seen at the time as a major cultural outflow, as many of the books were of historical and cultural significance. In addition, its library had received an annual grant since 1945 for the upkeep of the books from the Irish Exchequer.

A King's Inns team or individual has often won the Irish Times National Debating Championship, and in 2010 won the European Universities Debating Championships. In 2006 the Inns' hurling team competed in and won the Fergal Maher Cup (3rd Level Division 3) in their inaugural year and subsequently reached the final and semi-final.

The Hungry Tree, a London Plane that is encapsulating a park bench lies in the grounds of the King's Inns, near the south gate.

Notable alumni and academics

See also Category:Alumni of King's Inns

See also
 Northern Ireland Inn of Court

References

Notes

Citations

External links
 Official site – King's Inns

Legal organisations based in Ireland
Inns of Court
1541 establishments in Ireland
Tourist attractions in Dublin (city)